Edwin Martel Basil Hodge (born January 26, 1985) is  an American actor. He is recognized for portraying Dante Bishop in The Purge film series, and is the only actor to appear in all of the first three films.

Early life
Hodge was born on January 26, 1985, in Jacksonville, North Carolina, to Aldis Basil Hodge and Yolette Evangeline Richardson, but he was raised in New York.  Hodge's mother is from the state of Florida and his father from Saint Thomas, U. S. Virgin Islands. He is the older brother of actor Aldis Hodge.

Career
Hodge guest starred on an episode of the TNT series Leverage which stars his younger brother. He guest starred on an episode of One Tree Hill.

Hodge played the role of "the Bloody Stranger" in the horror film The Purge (2013) and its sequels The Purge: Anarchy (2014) and The Purge: Election Year (2016); "the Bloody Stranger" was revealed to be named Dante Bishop in the third film. He also appeared in the horror film As Above, So Below (2014).

Hodge also played the role of firefighter Rick Newhouse on Chicago Fire.

In 2019, Hodge played the role of Clayton Poole, husband of NASA astronaut Danielle Poole, in the first season of the Apple TV+ original science fiction space drama series For All Mankind.

Filmography

Film

Television

References

External links
 
 
 
 

1985 births
Living people
Male actors from North Carolina
American male child actors
American male film actors
American male television actors
American people of Dominica descent
People from Jacksonville, North Carolina
20th-century American male actors
21st-century American male actors
African-American male actors
20th-century African-American people
21st-century African-American people